This list of Cleveland State University people includes notable alumni, students, as well as current and former faculty of Cleveland State University, a public university located in Cleveland, Ohio.

Faculty

 Angelin Chang, Grammy-award winning classical pianist and professor of music; a graduate of the university's Cleveland-Marshall College of Law
 Michael Dumanis, Russian-American poet and Director of the Cleveland State University Poetry Center
 Lee Fisher, American politician and Dean of Cleveland-Marshall College of Law 
 Barbara G. Hoffman, American anthropologist and author of Griots at War: Conflict, Conciliation and Caste in Mande and filmmaker of Being Maasai Today ethnographic film series
 Thomas W. Hungerford, mathematician and author of many textbooks including Abstract Algebra: An Introduction
 Richard M. Perloff, American Communication scholar, writer of The Dynamics of Persuasion, currently in its sixth edition, international recognized expert on the subject
 Imad Rahman, Pakistani-American writer, I Dream of Microwaves
 Shuvo Roy, inventor of the artificial kidney
 Sheila Schwartz, fiction writer, creative writing professor
 Chas Smith, author, musician, radio personality, music professor
 Camilla Stivers, Distinguished Professor of Public Administration
 Jearl Walker, author of The Flying Circus of Physics; physics professor
 Tawfiq Oqal, CSU Treasurer 1989

Coaching staff

 Gary Waters, basketball coach
Dennis Gates, basketball coach

Notable alumni

Government

 Nina Turner (BA, MA), former Cleveland City Council Member, former Ohio State Senator, President of Our Revolution
 Jane L. Campbell, 56th mayor of Cleveland, first woman mayor of Cleveland
 Anthony J. Celebrezze Jr., Ohio Senator, Ohio Secretary of State, Ohio attorney general and gubernatorial candidate for Ohio.
 Frank D. Celebrezze Jr., Ohio Court of Appeals Judge
 Vlado Dimovski (Ph.D., 1994), Minister in the Government of Slovenia
 Ed Feighan (J.D., 1978), U.S. Congressman
 Ed FitzGerald, first Cuyahoga County Council Executive, former mayor of Lakewood, Ohio
 George L. Forbes, Cleveland City Council President, Cleveland NAACP President
 Marcia Fudge, Chairwoman of the Congressional Black Caucus in the 113th Congress, 18th United States Secretary of Housing and Urban Development
 Daniel Gaul, judge for the Cuyahoga County Common Pleas Court
 Dan Huberty, member of the Texas House of Representatives from Houston
 Frank G. Jackson, 57th Mayor of the City of Cleveland
 Frank Lausche, 55th and 57th Governor of Ohio, Ohio Senator, 47th mayor of Cleveland
 Donald C. Nugent (J.D., 1974) Federal District Court Judge
 Maureen O'Connor (J.D., 1980), current Ohio Supreme Court Justice
 Terrence O'Donnell (J.D., 1971), current Ohio Supreme Court Justice
 C. J. Prentiss, Ohio State Senator, founder of Policy Matters Ohio
 Andrew Puzder (B.A., 1975), CEO of CKE Restaurants/Secretary of Labor-designate (for President-elect Donald Trump)
 Shawn Richards, member of the National Assembly of Saint Kitts and Nevis
 Chris Ronayne (MUPDD), 3rd County Executive of Cuyahoga County, Ohio
 Carl B. Stokes (J.D., 1956), first African American mayor of a major U.S. city (Cleveland)
 Louis Stokes (J.D., 1953), 15-term Democratic Congressman
 Francis E. Sweeney Sr. (J.D., 1963), former Ohio Supreme Court Justice
 Ike Thompson, member of the Ohio House of Representatives
 Kahlil Seren (MSUS, 2010), 1st elected Mayor of Cleveland Heights, Ohio
 Lesley B. Wells (J.D., 1974), Federal District Court Judge
Pamela Evette (B.B.A), Lt. Governor of South Carolina

Sports

Johnny Bedford (attended), wrestler; professional mixed martial artist, formerly with the Ultimate Fighting Championship
 J'Nathan Bullock, professional basketball player
 Norris Cole, two-time NBA Champion basketball player
 M-Dogg 20/Matt Cross, born Matthew Capiccioni (B.A. 2006), professional wrestler
 Jerry Dybzinski, former professional baseball player
 Franklin Edwards, former professional basketball player
 Gerald Harris (History), all-time record for wins on the wrestling team; current professional mixed martial arts fighter
 Cedric Jackson, NBA basketball player
Trey Lewis (born 1992), basketball player in the Israeli Basketball Premier League
 Stipe Miocic (Communications/Marketing), baseball player; professional MMA fighter; two-time UFC Heavyweight Champion
 Clinton Smith, former NBA basketball player

Other
 Jerome Caja, performance artist
 Ali Haghighi, biochemist
 Gladisa Guadalupe, ballet dancer, artistic director and co-founder of the current Cleveland Ballet (B.A.)
 Ryan "Dr. F" Farrell, bass guitarist and keyboardist for American heavy metal band Mushroomhead (B.M. 2020) (M.M. 2022)
 Kid Leo, General Manager and afternoon DJ on Little Steven's Underground Garage on Sirius XM Radio (attended) (Honorary D.H.L., 2022)
 Kenneth A. Loparo, mechanical engineering professor 
 Scott Raab (B.A., 1984), writer, Esquire Magazine  
 Chris Ronayne, President of University Circle Inc.
 Emry Hollopeter, Notable Steel Bridge mentor
 Tim Russert (J.D., 1976), author; NBC Washington bureau chief; moderator of NBC's Meet the Press
 J. Everett Prewitt, novelist, former army officer.
 Steve Wood, Anglican bishop of the Carolinas

References

Cleveland State University people
Cleveland State University people